was a Japanese manga artist and character designer who frequently worked with TCJ in the 1960s and illustrated manga adaptations of their television series. In particular he created the manga for Super Jetter as well as serving as the anime's character designer. He also did the character designs for TCJ's Adventure on Gaboten Island. Hisamatsu wanted to be a manga artist since he was in third grade, and began writing manga in junior high school. He was an assistant to Osamu Tezuka.

Manga
 (Masakazu Manga Publishing, 1958) under the name Yumeji Tanaka
 (Bōken’ō, 1961)
 (Bōken’ō, 1962)
 (Bōken’ō, 1962)
 (Bōken’ō, 1962)
 (Bōken’ō, 1964)
 originally by Sanpei Shirato (We, July 1964-September 1965)
 (Weekly Shōnen Sunday, January 1965-January 1966)
 (Tanoshi Yōchien, 1968)
 (Weekly Shōnen Sunday)

 originally by Sanpei Shirato (1968)
 (Nakayoshi, 1968)
 (Kibou no Tomo, 1968)
 (September 1969-March 1970)
 (Shōnen Book, 1970)

 (TV-kun, 1976)
 (TV-kun, 1976–1977)
 (TV-kun, 1977)

With Shinsuke Mitani

All serialized in Weekly Heibon

 (1973–1974)
 (1974)
 (1974)
 (1974)

With Shin Hayama

All serialized in Weekly Heibon

 (1974)
 (1974)
 (1974)

Historical manga
Learning Manga Japanese History (Volume 1, Volume 3, Vol. 8, Vol. 11, Vol. 14, Vol. 18 (supervised by Kazuo Kasahara)
Sengoku Heroes (written by Sentaro Kubota)
Shiki (written by Sentaro Kubota)
Zhuge Liang (written by Sentaro Kubota)
Lady Kasuga (originally by Kazuhisa Hori)
San'yumeden (originally by Lee Won-hin)
Takeshi and soul (originally by Lee Won-hin)
Manga: Japan's Diplomacy Problem (supervision: Taro Yayama)
Read manga Kojiki (Aoi Hayashido?)
''Zen Master Dōgen (Vol. 1,2,3; written by Ryodô Awaya)

References

External links
 
 Fumio Hisamatsu  at Media Arts Database 

1943 births
2021 deaths
Manga artists from Aichi Prefecture
Anime character designers
People from Nagoya